The Thatcher House is a historic brick house located in Kingwood Township, about two miles from Frenchtown, in Hunterdon County, New Jersey. It is named after Jeremiah Thatcher (d. 1790), a local farmer. Built in 1765, the house was added to the National Register of Historic Places on December 4, 2020, for its significance in architecture. It features patterned brickwork with complex diamonds.

Gallery

See also 
 National Register of Historic Places listings in Hunterdon County, New Jersey
 List of the oldest buildings in New Jersey

References

External links 
 

Kingwood Township, New Jersey
National Register of Historic Places in Hunterdon County, New Jersey
Houses on the National Register of Historic Places in New Jersey
New Jersey Register of Historic Places
Houses completed in 1765
Houses in Hunterdon County, New Jersey
Brick buildings and structures
1765 establishments in New Jersey